Xylophilus luniger is a beetle that is endemic to New Zealand. This member of the family Aderidae is commonly collected by beating vegetation around the margins of native forest. The species has been collected in the North Island only.

Taxonomy 
This species was described by the British entomologist George Champion in 1916. X. luniger is one of at least 9 species found in the genus Xylophilus in New Zealand.

Biology 
The adult beetle is 1.33-1.66 millimeters in length and 0.6-0.8 millimeters in width.

Xylophilus luniger is sexually dimorphic; many male members of the genus Xylophilus have strangely modified antennae while females have unmodified straight antennae. In males of Xylophilus luniger, antennomeres 7-9 are highly modified.

References 

Beetles of New Zealand
Aderidae
Endemic fauna of New Zealand
Beetles described in 1916
Endemic insects of New Zealand